The Quarter at Tropicana is an Old Havana-themed enclosed shopping mall located at the Tropicana Casino & Resort Atlantic City in Atlantic City, New Jersey. It contains over 40 stores, nine restaurants, eleven nightclubs, and a spa.

History
The dining and retail complex was built along with a new 502-room hotel tower expansion at the Tropicana and a parking garage. With a total construction cost of $280 million, The Quarter officially opened on November 23, 2004. In 2015, Tropicana added more shops into the Quarter.

References

External links
 [www.tropicana.net]

Shopping malls established in 2004
Shopping malls in New Jersey
Buildings and structures in Atlantic City, New Jersey
Tourist attractions in Atlantic County, New Jersey